Nimbalkar is a Maratha clan, which derives its surname from the forest of Nimbalak in Phaltan taluka, Satara district, Maharashtra, India.

Some Nimbalkars served as head of the deshmukhs (sardeshmukhs or sardars) during the period of the Deccan Sultanates and Mughal empire.

Notables
Bajaji Rao Naik Nimbalkar
Saibai

References

Maratha clans
Surnames